The Islamic Institute of Toronto (IIT) is a non-profit Islamic educational institute in Toronto, Canada.

History 
The IIT was established in 1996. 

In 2005 the IIT joined other Canadian imams in denouncing terrorism.

In 2013 the IIT helped fund a Muslim prayer space at Emmanuel College.

In 2020 the IIT cancelled in person prayer services due to the COVID-19 pandemic. Digital services and outdoor services were held in their place. The campus hosted pop-up testing centers during the pandemic.

Campus
The Campus includes a conference center, triple gymnasium, library, a mosque, and a swimming pool. The complex will also be home to an Islamic High School that will cater to Muslim students.

Phase One of the building project is in its advanced stages with the building constructed while finishing touches are placed. Phase One will consist of a classroom, library, multi-purpose hall, and other necessary amenities.

Academics
The IIT's elementary school program ranked in the top 20 in Ontario according to a 2019 report by the Fraser Institute.

Courses 
The Islamic Institute of Toronto curriculum includes courses on Islamic faith and jurisprudence, Fiqh, Qur'anic Studies, Islamic History, and Arabic. Fees vary between courses and are typically around $70. There is no formal sponsorship of students.

Certificates are offered in Classical Arabic, Access to Qur'anic Arabic, and Modern Standard Arabic. 
The Faculty of Qur'anic Studies offer certificate programs aimed at understanding the Qur'an, its revelation, transmission, message, and recitation (qirat).

The Faculty of Islamic Studies offers certificate programs in Islamic Studies on two levels - Level One Certificate and Level Two Certificate. The curriculum covers:
Aqidah
Fiqh
Usul al-fiqh
Ibaadat (Salaah, Zakaah, Fasting and Hajj)
Islamic Ethics
Hadith Studies
Islamic History and Civilization
Islamic Spirituality
Quranic Sciences
Marriage and Family Life

Other programs
Since 2007 the IIT has had a scouting group: the 163rd IIT Scouts group

See also
Islamic Circle of North America
List of Islamic and Muslim related topics
McGill University Institute of Islamic Studies

References

External links

Educational institutions established in 1996
Islamic universities and colleges in Canada
Universities and colleges in Toronto
Education in Scarborough, Toronto
Islam in Toronto
1996 establishments in Ontario